Ryan McGuyre (born May 30, 1976) is an American volleyball head coach at Baylor University (2015–present).

Coaching career

Florida State
On August 2, 2013, McGuyre was announced as an assistant coach for the Florida State volleyball program.

Baylor
On December 24, 2014, McGuyre was announced as the new head coach of the Baylor volleyball program.

Head Coaching Record

Women's volleyball

Men's volleyball

References

External links
 https://baylorbears.com/sports/womens-volleyball/roster/coaches/ryan-mcguyre/1435

Living people
1976 births
Sportspeople from California
American volleyball coaches
Baylor Bears women's volleyball coaches
Florida State Seminoles volleyball coaches
Maryland Terrapins women's volleyball coaches